WNCT-FM (107.9 FM) is a radio station  broadcasting an Adult Contemporary format. Licensed to Greenville, North Carolina, United States, the station serves the Rocky Mount, Greenville-New Bern-Jacksonville area.  The station is currently owned by Henry W. Hinton, Jr., through licensee Inner Banks Media, LLC.

History
In August 1963, Roy H. Park, owner of WNCT-TV, bought WGTC, Greenville's oldest radio station, which broadcast at 5,000 watts at 1590 AM, and WGTC-FM, which was to shortly take to the air on 107.7 FM. WGTC-FM signed on December 22, 1963, and changed callsigns to WNCT-FM one month later. The station was referred to as "FM 108" as an instrumental beautiful music station. The station moved to 107.9 FM in 1982. In 1992, music containing vocals were added - first two cuts per hour, then three, until the instrumentals were dropped entirely. This format change occurred around the same time as the death of Roy H Park. In 1993, the format was changed to light adult contemporary, adopting the moniker "Easy 108". Later that year, the name was changed to "Lite 108". The switch to "Oldies 107.9" came in 1994 after several years of soft adult contemporary music.

On February 2, 2017, Beasley announced that it would sell its six stations and four translators in the Greenville-New Bern-Jacksonville, North Carolina market, including WNCT-FM, to Curtis Media Group for $11 million to reduce the company's debt; WNCT-FM was concurrently divested to Inner Banks Media to comply with FCC ownership limits. The sale was completed on May 1, 2017.

As of 2022, WNCT-FM had evolved from classic hits to adult contemporary, calling itself "The most variety for the workday". Artists included Adele, Bon Jovi, Michael Jackson, Madonna, Bruno Mars, Prince and The Weeknd, with special weekend oldies shows.

References

External links

NCT-FM
Mainstream adult contemporary radio stations in the United States
Radio stations established in 1963
1963 establishments in North Carolina